Juan Lozano, O.E.S.A. (April, 1610 – 3 July 1679) was a Roman Catholic prelate who served as Archbishop (Personal Title) of Plasencia (1677–1679),
Archbishop of Palermo (1669–1677),
Bishop of Mazara del Vallo (1656–1669), and  
Bishop of Tropea (1646–1656).

Biography
Juan Lozano was born in Jumilla, Spain in April 1610 and ordained a priest in the Order of Saint Augustine.
On 27 August 1646, he was selected by the King of Spain and confirmed by Pope Innocent X on 17 December 1646 as Bishop of Tropea. 
On 23 July 1655, he was selected by the King of Spain and confirmed by Pope Alexander VI on 29 May 1656 as Bishop of Mazara del Vallo. 
On 4 February 1669, he was appointed during the papacy of Pope Clement IX as Archbishop of Palermo. 
On 26 April 1677, he was appointed during the papacy of Pope Innocent XI as Archbishop (Personal Title) of Plasencia.
He served as Archbishop of Plasencia until his death on 3 July 1679.

References

External links and additional sources
 (for Chronology of Bishops) 
 (for Chronology of Bishops) 
 (for Chronology of Bishops) 
 (for Chronology of Bishops) 
 (for Chronology of Bishops) 
 (for Chronology of Bishops) 
 (for Chronology of Bishops)  
 (for Chronology of Bishops) 

17th-century Italian Roman Catholic bishops
Bishops appointed by Pope Innocent X
Bishops appointed by Pope Alexander VI
Bishops appointed by Pope Clement IX
Bishops appointed by Pope Innocent XI
1610 births
1679 deaths
Augustinian bishops